Stand Still, Look Pretty is the only studio album by the Wreckers, a country pop duo consisting of solo artists Michelle Branch and Jessica Harp. It was released in the United States on May 23, 2006 and has been released in other countries.

The album debuted at number fourteen on the U.S. Billboard 200 with 44,000 copies sold in its first week. In September 2006, the RIAA certified Stand Still, Look Pretty Gold for shipments to retailers of 500,000 copies. The album sold 853,000 copies in the U.S. up to March 2012.

The first single, "Leave the Pieces", peaked at number 34 on the U.S. Billboard Hot 100 and topped the Hot Country Songs chart. In December 2006, the Wreckers were nominated for a Grammy Award for Best Country Performance by a Duo or Group with Vocal for the song. The second single, "My, Oh My", reached number 87 on the Hot 100 and the Top Ten on the Hot Country Songs chart. The third single, "Tennessee", reached number 33 on the Hot Country Songs chart. "Cigarettes" was originally planned as the fourth single, but was canceled due to the band's separation. Another track, "The Good Kind", was featured on the teen soap opera One Tree Hill in early 2005, after which it hit number 15 on the Bubbling Under Hot 100 Singles chart.

Track listing

Personnel
Compiled from liner notes.

Musicians
The Wreckers
Michelle Branch - vocals, harmonica, acoustic guitar
Jessica Harp - vocals, harmonica, acoustic guitar

All tracks except "Leave the Pieces" and "My, Oh My"
Rick Depofi - keyboards, percussion, horns
Charley Drayton - drums
Teddy Landau - bass guitar
John Leventhal - guitars, bass guitar, banjo, mandolin, keyboards, percussion
Rich Pagano - drums
Shawn Pelton - drums

"My, Oh My"
Stuart Duncan - fiddle, mandolin
Shannon Forrest - drums
Audley Freed - guitars
Randy Kohrs - Dobro
Michael Rojas - Hammond B-3 organ
Biff Watson - National guitar
Paul Worley - guitars
Craig Young - bass guitar

"Leave the Pieces"
Abe Laboriel Jr. - drums
Teddy Landau - bass guitar
Sid Page - fiddle
John Shanks - guitars, mandolin, banjo, keyboards

Technical
Michelle Branch - production ("Leave the Pieces" only)
Rick Depofi - production (all tracks except "Leave the Pieces" and "My, Oh My")
John Leventhal - production (all tracks except "Leave the Pieces" and "My, Oh My")
Stephen Marcussen - mastering
John Shanks - production ("Leave the Pieces" only)
Paul Worley - production ("My, Oh My" only)

Chart performance

Weekly charts

Year-end charts

Singles

Certifications

References

External links
 

2006 debut albums
Maverick Records albums
The Wreckers albums